Angelica Maria Hinojosa Diaz (born ) is a Dominican Republic volleyball player. She is part of the Dominican Republic women's national volleyball team.

She participated in the 2015 FIVB Volleyball World Grand Prix.
On club level she played for Cien Fuego in 2015.

References

1997 births
Living people
Dominican Republic women's volleyball players
Place of birth missing (living people)